FINS may refer to:
 Factory Interface Network Service, a network protocol.